Xe or XE may refer to:

 Xenon, symbol Xe, a chemical element

Businesses and organizations
 XE.com, a currency and foreign exchange rate website
 Chi Epsilon (XE), a US national civil engineering honor society
 Korea Express Air (IATA code XE)
 Academi, a private military company in US formerly known as Xe Services and Blackwater Worldwide

Computing

 Oracle Express Edition, a database management system free to distribute
 XE series home computers of the Atari 8-bit family (including the 65XE, 130XE and 800XE)
 XE Delphi, a version of Delphi (programming language) released in 2010
Intel Xe, product name for a GPU architecture, introduced c.2020

Other uses
 Xe (pronoun), a gender-neutral pronoun
 Xe (interjection), or che, a typical Valencian interjection
 Xe (Zs album), 2015
 Christmas Eve, in a common Japanese abbreviation
 Jaguar XE, an automobile made by Jaguar
 Extreme E, an electric offroad rally racing series
 XE variant of SARS-CoV-2, a subvariant of Omicron
The ITU prefix for Mexican A.M. & shortwave radio stations’ callsigns.

See also